Philipp Grüneberg (born 21 May 1992 in Berlin) is a German footballer who plays as a forward for SV Lichtenberg 47.

External links 
 

1992 births
Living people
Footballers from Berlin
German footballers
Association football forwards
3. Liga players
1. FC Union Berlin players
FC Carl Zeiss Jena players
FSV Zwickau players
SV Lichtenberg 47 players
FSV Optik Rathenow players